The Secunderabad Cavalry Brigade was a cavalry brigade of the British Indian Army formed in 1907 as a result of the Kitchener Reforms.  It was mobilized as 9th (Secunderabad) Cavalry Brigade at the outbreak of the First World War and departed for France.  It served on the Western Front as part of the 1st and 2nd Indian Cavalry Divisions until it was broken up in March 1918.

History
The Kitchener Reforms, carried out during Lord Kitchener's tenure as Commander-in-Chief, India (1902–09), completed the unification of the three former Presidency armies, the Punjab Frontier Force, the Hyderabad Contingent and other local forces into one Indian Army.  Kitchener identified the Indian Army's main task as the defence of the North-West Frontier against foreign aggression (particularly Russian expansion into Afghanistan) with internal security relegated to a secondary role.  The Army was organized into divisions and brigades that would act as field formations but also included internal security troops.

The Secunderabad Cavalry Brigade was formed on 17 September 1907 as a result of the Kitchener Reforms.  The brigade formed part of the 9th (Secunderabad) Division.

9th (Secunderabad) Cavalry Brigade
At the outbreak of the First World War, the Secunderabad Cavalry Brigade was still part of the 9th (Secunderabad) Division.  It was mobilized in August 1914 as the 9th (Secunderabad) Cavalry Brigade with the first elements of Indian Expeditionary Force A.  It was composed of one British (7th (Princess Royal's) Dragoon Guards) and two Indian (20th Deccan Horse and 34th Prince Albert Victor's Own Poona Horse) cavalry regiments; it sailed with N Battery, Royal Horse Artillery, Secunderabad Cavalry Brigade Field Ambulance, H Section Ammunition Column and 1st Field Troop, 1st King George's Own Sappers and Miners.

It paused briefly in Egypt before arriving in France on 12 October 1914 where it was attached to the Indian Corps and then to the 1st Indian Cavalry Division in November.  At this time, just the 3rd (Ambala) Cavalry Brigade had reached the Front: the other two brigades of the division2nd (Sialkot) and 8th (Lucknow)had been held up after arrival in France by horse sickness and did not reach the Front until 810 December.  While in France, the brigade was known by its geographical rather than numerical designation so as to avoid confusion with the British 9th Cavalry Brigade also serving on the Western Front at the same time.

Among the brigade's engagements in 1914 were the Battle of La Bassée, the Battle of Armentières and the Battle of Givenchy.  On 24 November, Lieutenant Frank de Pass of the 34th Prince Albert Victor's Own Poona Horse won the Victoria Cross at Festubert.

The brigade was assigned to the 2nd Indian Cavalry Division on 23 December 1914 and remained with it until broken up in Match 1918.

In 1916, the brigade took part in the Battle of the Somme, notably the Battle of Bazentin (1417 July) and the Battle of Flers–Courcelette (1522 September).  In 1917, the brigade took part in the Battle of Cambrai, notably the Tank Attack (2021 November) and the German Counter-attacks (30 November3 December).  At other times it was held in reserve in case of a breakthrough, although it did send parties to the trenches on a number of occasions. They would hold the line, or act as Pioneers; such parties were designated as the Secunderabad Battalion.

Dissolved
In March 1918, the brigade was broken up in France. The British units (7th (Princess Royal's) Dragoon Guards and N Battery, Royal Horse Artillery) remained in France and the Indian elements were sent to Egypt. On 24 April 1918, these were merged with the 7th Mounted Brigade and joined the new 2nd Mounted Division. On 22 July 1918 the 7th Mounted Brigade was redesignated as 14th Cavalry Brigade and the division as 5th Cavalry Division.

Orders of battle

Commanders
The Secunderabad Cavalry Brigade / 9th (Secunderabad) Cavalry Brigade had the following commanders:

See also

 Indian Cavalry Corps order of battle First World War
 Indian Expeditionary Force A

Notes

References

Bibliography

External links
 
 

C09
Cavalry brigades of the British Indian Army
Military units and formations established in 1907
Military units and formations disestablished in 1918